Ashley Arrison is an American singer-songwriter who has worked with Kelly Clarkson, Kacey Musgraves and other artists.

Biography
Arrison grew up in Tennessee and later moved to Los Angeles, California.

Arrison has released one EP and one album as a solo singer-songwriter, sung backing vocals for Lindsay Lohan and Badly Drawn Boy, and has written songs for Kelly Clarkson and Kacey Musgraves, whom Arrison introduced to mutual friend, Nashville songwriter and subsequent longtime collaborator Shane McAnally. She has also performed with Amy Lee of Evanescence and, as a child, Justin Timberlake.

Married to guitarist for Kelly Clarkson and songwriter Aben Eubanks since April 22, 2011, the couple were the subject of a Season 12 HGTV Property Brothers episode.

Arrison's influences include James Taylor, Sarah McLachlan and Ryan Adams.

Discography
Talking Circles (2008)
Hearts on Parade (2010)

Arrison is also a credited contributor on the following songs or albums:

Badly Drawn Boy, About a Boy (2002)
Lindsay Lohan, A Little More Personal (Raw) (2005)

Songs written

References

American women country singers
American country singer-songwriters
American women singer-songwriters
Living people
Singer-songwriters from Tennessee
Year of birth missing (living people)
21st-century American women